Dariusz Włodzimierz Kołodziejczyk (born 1962) is a Polish historian and professor of the University of Warsaw. A student of Marian Małowist, Antoni Mączak and Halil İnalcık, he specializes in the history of diplomacy and history of Poland and Turkey (Ottoman Empire).

Works
 Podole pod panowaniem tureckim. Ejalet Kamieniecki 1672-1699, Warszawa 1994
 Ottoman-Polish Diplomatic Relations (15th-18th century). An Annotated Edition of 'Ahdnames and Other Documents, Leiden 2000
 Turcja, Warszawa 2000
 Defter-i Mufassal-i Eyalet-i Kamanice: The Ottoman Survey Register of Podolia (ca. 1681), Cambridge, Massachusetts 2004
 The Crimean Khanate and Poland-Lithuania: International Diplomacy on the European Periphery (15th-18th Century). A Study of Peace Treaties Followed by Annotated Documents, Leiden 2011

References

External links

 Bio note at the University of Warsaw

1962 births
Living people
20th-century Polish historians
Polish male non-fiction writers
21st-century Polish historians
Academic staff of the University of Warsaw